Lost Soul may refer to:

 Lost Soul (band), a Polish technical death metal band
 Lost Soul (play), a 2007 play by David Kirby
 Lost Soul (2009 film), a 2009 film starring Nick Mancuso
 Lost Soul: The Doomed Journey of Richard Stanley's Island of Dr. Moreau, a 2014 documentary about the making of the 1996 film The Island of Dr. Moreau
 Lost Soul, a flying creature in the video game Doom 3: Resurrection of Evil
 Lost Soul Mountain, a summit in Montana, United States
Lost souls, a character type in Soul (2020 film)

See also
 Little Lost Soul, an album by Matt Elliott recording as The Third Eye Foundation
 Lost (disambiguation)
 Lost Souls (disambiguation)
 Soul